State Route 119 (SR 119) is an  state highway that runs south-to-north in the east-central part of the U.S. state of Georgia. It runs from Riceboro to the Hinesville – Fort Stewart metropolitan area and curves to the northeast, through Pembroke and Springfield, and enters South Carolina north of Clyo, where the roadway continues as South Carolina Highway 119.

Route description
SR 119 begins at an intersection with US 17/SR 25 (Ocean Highway) in Riceboro, in Liberty County. It heads west to Walthourville, where it intersects US 84/SR 38 (Oglethorpe Highway). The highway goes northward, past the Liberty County Airport and Savannah Technical College – Liberty Campus, to Hinesville. There, it intersects SR 196 (Elma G. Miles Parkway). The two routes head concurrent to the northeast through town. At General Screven Way, SR 119 splits off to the northwest, while SR 196 heads southeast. Just before SR 119 crosses the southern border of Fort Stewart, it meets the eastern terminus of SR 38 Connector (General Stewart Way). Less than  later, it intersects SR 144. The two routes have a brief concurrency to the north-northwest. The roadway curves to the northeast to cross over the Canoochee River, which marks the Liberty–Bryan county line. A short distance later, the route crosses the northern border of Fort Stewart. North of the fort, SR 119 intersects US 280/SR 30/SR 67 (Bacon Street) in the town of Pembroke. At this intersection, SR 67 heads north, concurrent with SR 119. It departs to the northeast on Camelia Drive. It continues to the northeast, enters Bulloch County, and has an interchange with Interstate 16 (I-16). Immediately after is an intersection with the eastern terminus of SR 46. Little over  later, it has a very brief concurrency with US 80/SR 26, before continuing its northeastern routing. It crosses over the Ogeechee River, which marks the Bulloch–Effingham county line. Northeast, in the town of Guyton, is SR 17 (Central Boulevard). Farther to the northeast is Springfield. In Springfield, SR 119 intersects SR 21. Then, it turns left onto Laurel Street. It curves to the northeast, intersecting SR 21 Spur. SR 119 gradually curves to the north, passes through the town of Clyo, and meets its northern terminus, the South Carolina state line at the Savannah River. There, the roadway continues into South Carolina as South Carolina Highway 119.

The only section of SR 119 that is part of the National Highway System, a system of roadways important to the nation's economy, defense, and mobility, is the section from SR 38 Connector, in Hinesville to US 280/SR 30/SR 67 in Pembroke.

Major intersections

Special routes

Connector route

State Route 119 Connector (SR 119 Conn.) is a  connector route that exists entirely within the southeastern part of Bulloch County.

SR 119 Conn. begins at an intersection with the SR 119 mainline (Ivan Ho Drive), southeast of Guyton and the Ogeechee River. The highway heads north-northwest and curves to the northwest, until it enters Stilson. In town, the road curves to the west-southwest until it meets its northern terminus, an intersection with US 80/SR 26, just outside town.

SR 119 Conn. is not part of the National Highway System, a system of roadways important to the nation's economy, defense, and mobility.

Spur route

State Route 119 Spur (SR 119 Spur) is a  Spur route that exists entirely within the southeastern part of Bulloch County.

SR 119 Spur begins at an intersection with the SR 119 mainline (Ivan Ho Drive), southeast of Guyton and the Ogeechee River. The highway curves to the northwest until it meets its northern terminus, an intersection with SR 119 Connector, a brief distance later.

SR 119 Spur is not part of the National Highway System, a system of roadways important to the nation's economy, defense, and mobility.

See also

References

External links

 Georgia Roads (Routes 101-120)
 Georgia State Route 119 on State-Ends.com

119
Transportation in Liberty County, Georgia
Transportation in Bryan County, Georgia
Transportation in Bulloch County, Georgia
Transportation in Effingham County, Georgia
Hinesville, Georgia
Hinesville metropolitan area